Misadventures is the full-length debut album by pop punk/hardcore band Such Gold. The album was released on August 14, 2012 through Razor and Tie Records. The album was praised by critics and fans a like and is a major stepping stone for the upcoming band, and it was a more mature album compared to the band's previous releases; Pedestals, Stand Tall, and the split with Into It Over It. The album was released on 12" records, compact discs, as well as digital download, and the first single "Storyteller" was also released on a 7" inch record, with the B-side being "Locked Out of the Magic Theater." To promote the album the band went on a headlining tour with Mixtapes and Citizen.

Track listing

Personnel
Such Gold
 Devan Bentley - drums
 Skylar Sarkis - guitar/vocals
 Ben Kotin - vocals
 Nate Derby - guitar
 Devon Hubbard - bass/vocals

References

2012 albums
Such Gold albums
Razor & Tie albums